Gerald Schubert (born 1939) is a geophysicist and Professor Emeritus of Earth, Planetary, and Space Sciences at UCLA. His research has broadly dealt with modeling the structure and dynamics of the interiors and atmospheres and Earth and other planets.

He got degrees in engineering physics and aeronautical engineering from Cornell University and his Ph.D. in engineering and aeronautical sciences from the University of California, Berkeley.

Awards
He was elected as member of the National Academy of Sciences in 2002. He is a Fellow of the American Geophysical Union. He was a Guggenheim Fellow in 1972.

References

External links
Homepage

1939 births
Living people
American geophysicists
Fellows of the American Geophysical Union
Members of the United States National Academy of Sciences
University of California, Los Angeles faculty
Cornell University College of Engineering alumni
University of California, Berkeley alumni